Gwangnaru Station is a station on the Seoul Subway Line 5 in Gwangjin-gu, Seoul. Its station subname is Presbyterian Univ. & Theological Seminary, where said university is nearby Exit 2.

The platform is a two-sided, two-line curved platform with screen doors.

Station layout

Vicinity
Exit 1: Gwangjang Elementary and Middle Schools
Exit 2: W Seoul Walkerhill, Presbyterian College and Theological Seminary
Exit 3: Gwangnam Elementary, Middle & High Schools
Exit 4: Yangjin Elementary & Middle Schools
All exits: Gwangjin Public Digital Library

References 

Railway stations opened in 1995
Seoul Metropolitan Subway stations
Metro stations in Gwangjin District